Zoran Roganović (born 26 December 1977) is a Montenegrin former handball player and current coach of Swedish club Eskilstuna Guif.

Club career
Born in Cetinje, Roganović started out at his hometown club Lovćen. He also played for fellow Yugoslav team Partizan (1998–2000), before going abroad. After spending three seasons in three countries, Roganović moved to Sweden and joined H43 Lund in 2003. He spent 11 years at the club, also having brief loan spells with Aragón, Al Sadd Beirut, Al Qiyadah, El Jaish and Lekhwiya. After playing for fellow Swedish teams Lugi HF and HK Malmö, Roganović returned to H43 Lund for the 2017–18 season.

International career
At international level, Roganović represented Montenegro at the 2008 European Men's Handball Championship and 2013 World Men's Handball Championship.

Coaching career
In August 2018, Roganović was appointed as coach of the Montenegro national team. He coached them at the 2020 European Men's Handball Championship, as they would record their first ever victory at the European Championships.

Honours
Partizan
 Handball Championship of FR Yugoslavia: 1998–99

References

External links

 EHF record

1977 births
Living people
Sportspeople from Cetinje
Montenegrin male handball players
RK Partizan players
Lugi HF players
Liga ASOBAL players
Expatriate handball players
Serbia and Montenegro expatriate sportspeople in Greece
Serbia and Montenegro expatriate sportspeople in Bosnia and Herzegovina
Serbia and Montenegro expatriate sportspeople in Sweden
Serbia and Montenegro expatriate sportspeople in Spain
Montenegrin expatriate sportspeople in Sweden
Montenegrin expatriate sportspeople in Qatar
Montenegrin handball coaches
Handball coaches of international teams
Montenegrin expatriate sportspeople in Portugal